′Ira (also spelled Areh, ′Ara or Ora) is a village in southeastern Syria, administratively part of the as-Suwayda District of the as-Suwayda Governorate, located south of as-Suwayda. In the 2004 census, it had a population of 6,136. Its inhabitants are predominantly Druze.

History
In 1596 the village appeared under the name of "Timri" in the Ottoman tax registers as part of the nahiya (subdistrict) of Bani Nasiyya in the Qadaa of Hauran. It had a Muslim population consisting of twenty-five households and fourteen bachelors, and a Christian population of five households. They paid a fixed tax-rate of 40% on agricultural products, including wheat, barley, summer crops, goats and beehives, in addition to occasional revenues; the taxes totaled 16,000 akçe.

In 1838 'Ira was reported to be populated with Druze and Greek Orthodox Christians.

'Ira was resettled by Druze migrants in the early 19th century. It was controlled by the Al Hamdan family, who used it as a secondary headquarters. The Al Hamdan were ousted from 'Ira in 1857 by Ismail al-Atrash. This marked the consolidation of Bani al-Atrash supremacy in Jabal Hauran over the Al Hamdan. Following Ismail's death in 1869, his son Ibrahim became head of the family and was recognized by Rashid Pasha, governor of Damascus, as governor of 'Ira. His brother succeeded him in 1883 and based himself in 'Ira. The village was attacked by Ruwala tribesmen in 1893 during hostilities between the Bani al-Atrash and the Ottomans. Four residents were killed.

References

Bibliography

External links 
  Map of the town, Google Maps

19th-century establishments in the Ottoman Empire
Druze communities in Syria
Populated places in as-Suwayda District